Hardeep Reel (born 3 March 1981) is a former Kenyan squash player. He has competed at the Commonwealth Games in 2006, 2010, 2014 and 2018.

He achieved his highest career ranking of 308 in March 2007.

References 

1981 births
Living people
Kenyan male squash players
Squash players at the 2006 Commonwealth Games
Squash players at the 2010 Commonwealth Games
Squash players at the 2014 Commonwealth Games
Squash players at the 2018 Commonwealth Games
Commonwealth Games competitors for Kenya
Sportspeople from Nairobi